20 Dead Flower Children were an American metal band from Detroit, Michigan, which formed in 1994. They released two records during 1996–1997, before breaking up in the early 2000s.

History
Formed during 1994, the band released their sef-titled debut 20 Dead Flower Children through local label Overture Records in February 1996. The vocalist for this record, known as "Von", would depart shortly after it was released. While his departure placed 20 Dead Flower Children's future in doubt, they would eventually find a new vocalist,  Dennis "D-Hauz" Hogan, and signed to rapper Esham's Overcore Records. Their second album, titled Candy Toy Guns and Television, was released by the label on June 24, 1997.

In 1998, the band replaced their bassist and relocated to Huntington Beach, California. They later joined the TVT Records roster, as Overcore Records had become a subsidiary of TVT. The label would reissue Candy Toy Guns and Television on Halloween of 2000. However, this partnership yielded no new studio recording for the band, aside from various demos released by the band themselves. In 2001, 20 Dead Flower Children split up.

On June 3, 2006, a one-off reunion show occurred at The Brigg in Huntington Beach.

Members

Final line-up
Dennis Hogan ‘D-Hauz’ – (vocals)
Keith Lowers – (guitars/programming)
Jason Garrison – (drums)
Dirt-E – (bass)

Past members
Von Bortz – (vocals)
Justin Starr (bass)
Michael Joh ‘Nico’ (bass)
Jeff Wright (bass)

Discography

Albums
 20 Dead Flower Children (1996)
 Candy Toy Guns and Television (1997)

Singles
 "Here I Am" (1996)

Demos
 Garage Demos (2001)

References

American nu metal musical groups
Heavy metal musical groups from Michigan
TVT Records artists
Musical groups established in 1994
Musical groups disestablished in 2006
American industrial metal musical groups